Serratella micheneri is a species of spiny crawler mayfly in the family Ephemerellidae. It is found in Central America, North America. In North America its range includes northern Mexico, and the western United States.

References

Mayflies
Articles created by Qbugbot
Insects described in 1934